Keith Allen Brueckner (March 19, 1924 – September 19, 2014) was an American theoretical physicist who made important contributions in several areas of physics, including many-body theory in condensed matter physics, and laser fusion.

Biography
Brueckner was born in Minneapolis on March 19, 1924. He earned a B.A. and M.A. in mathematics from the University of Minnesota in 1945 and 1947 and a Ph.D. in physics from the University of California, Berkeley, in 1950.  He died on September 19, 2014 at the age of 90.

After completing his Ph.D. he joined the physics faculty at Indiana University (1951–1955) and then at the University of Pennsylvania (1956–1959). In 1959, Brueckner was recruited by Roger Revelle to come to University of California, San Diego, where he became one of the founders of the Department of Physics. Brueckner was instrumental in recruiting many faculty members to the new campus, as well as setting up the curriculum for the School of Science and Engineering. Over the course of his career at UC San Diego, Brueckner served as Director of the Institute of Radiation Physics and Aerodynamics and, later, Director of the Institute for Pure and Applied Physical Sciences.

He and Murray Gell-Mann collaborated to show that the random phase approximation (RPA) can be derived by summing a series of Feynman diagrams.  The relevance and correctness of RPA were heavily debated at the time. This was a seminal result, as it is often considered to be the first major accomplishment of modern quantum many-particle theory and has been an inspiration for the entire field.

Awards
 Dannie Heineman Prize for Mathematical Physics, 1963

References

External links
Keith A. Brueckner Papers MSS 0094. Special Collections & Archives, UC San Diego Library.
 Oral History interview transcript for Keith Brueckner on 2 July 1986, American Institute of Physics, Niels Bohr Library & Archives
 Oral History interview transcript for Keith Brueckner on 25 April 2008, American Institute of Physics, Niels Bohr Library & Archives

1924 births
2014 deaths
University of Minnesota College of Liberal Arts alumni
Members of the United States National Academy of Sciences
American physicists
Indiana University faculty
University of Pennsylvania faculty
University of California, Berkeley alumni